Deshawn Stephens (born October 9, 1989) is an American professional basketball player for Dinamo Sassari of the Italian Lega Basket Serie A (LBA). He played college basketball for Santa Monica College and San Diego State before playing professionally in Japan, Turkey, France, Italy and Israel.

College career
Stephens began his college career at Santa Monica College. As a sophomore, he led the Corsairs to a 20-8 record and the Western State Conference championship. Stephens was a Western State-South Division Conference first-team all-league selection. In 2011, he transferred to San Diego State. In two seasons with the Aztecs he averaged 5.6 points and 5 rebounds in 20.2 minutes per game.

College statistics

|-
| style="text-align:left;"| 2011-12
| style="text-align:left;"| San Diego State
| 34 ||3  ||18.7  || .608 || .000 || .397|| 4.88 ||032  || 0.35 || 0.29 || 5.21
|-
| style="text-align:left;"| 2012-13
| style="text-align:left;"| San Diego State
| 34 ||34  ||21.7  || .593 || .000 || .507|| 5.09 ||0.24  || 0.62 || 0.50 || 6.06
|-
|- class="sortbottom"
! style="text-align:center;" colspan=2|  Career

!68 ||37 || 20.2 ||.600  || .000 ||.454  || 4.99 ||0.28  || 0.49 ||0.40  || 5.63
|-

Professional career

2013–14 season
After going undrafted in the 2013 NBA draft, Stephens signed with the Hamamatsu Higashimikawa Phoenix of the Japanese bj league. In 27 games for Hamamatsu, he averaged 9.1 points and 5.9 rebounds. On February 5, 2014, Stephens was released  by the Phoenix. Two days later, he signed with the Akita Northern Happinets of the bj league. In 26 games for Akita, Stephens averaged 11.7 points and 7.2 rebounds.

2014–15 season
Stephens stayed with the Northern Happinets for the 2014-15 season. In 53 games he averaged 14.4 points, 8.6 rebounds and 1.6 assists. Akita lost in the bj league finals to Stephens' former team, Hamamatsu Higashimikawa Phoenix, 71 - 69. He led all players with 30 points on 12-for-13 shooting from the field and grabbed 10 rebounds.

2015–16 season
On September 15, 2015, Stephens signed with the Bandırma Kırmızı of the TBL. In October 2015, he made a move to the Banvit B.K. of the BSL. On January 4, 2016, Stephens left Turkey and signed with the Champagne Châlons-Reims of the French LNB Pro A In 19 games for Champagne Châlons-Reims he averaged 8.9 points and 3.8 rebounds in 21.6 minutes.

2016–17 season
On July 28, 2016, Stephens signed with the Akita Northern Happinets, returning to the club for a second stint. On March 9, 2017, Stephens was acquired by the Los Angeles D-Fenders of the NBA Development League.

2017–18 season
On August 4, 2017, Stephens signed with the Italian team Cagliari Dinamo Academy of the Serie A2 Basket. On December 3, 2017, Stephens recorded a career-high 34 points, shooting 15-of-18 from the field, along with twelve rebounds and two assists in a 93–94 loss to Cuore di Napoli.

2018–19 season
On July 29, 2018, Stephens signed with the Israeli team Maccabi Rishon LeZion for the 2018–19 season. In October 2018, Stephens helped Rishon LeZion to win the 2018 Israeli League Cup. On April 7, 2019, Stephens parted ways with Rishon LeZion to join Hapoel Tel Aviv for the rest of the season. Stephens helped Hapoel reach the 2019 Israeli League Playoffs, where they eventually were eliminated by Maccabi Tel Aviv in the Quarterfinals.

2019–20 season
On September 18, 2019, he has signed with Fortitudo Bologna of the Italian Lega Basket Serie A (LBA).

2020–21 season
On July 11, 2020, he has signed with Bakken Bears of Denmark's Basketligaen.

2021–22 season
On June 11, 2021, he has signed with Igokea of the Bosnian League.

2022–23 season
On November 11, 2022, he signed with Dinamo Sassari of the Italian Lega Basket Serie A (LBA).

The Basketball Tournament
In the summers of 2015 and 2017, Stephens played in The Basketball Tournament on ESPN for Team Challenge ALS. He competed for the $2 million prize in 2017, and for Team Challenge ALS, he averaged 5.6 points per game. Stephens helped take the sixth-seeded Team Challenge ALS to the Championship Game of the tournament, where they lost in a close game to Overseas Elite 86-83.

In TBT 2018, Stephens averaged 8.5 points per game, 5.5 rebounds per game and shot 91 percent from the free-throw line for Team Challenge ALS. They reached the West Regional Championship Game before losing to eventual tournament runner-up Eberlein Drive.

Personal life
His father died when he was six years old. His mother, Beverly Triggs, is a licensed vocational nurse. He married in July 2021 to Iris Truley.

Career statistics

Regular season 

|-
| style="text-align:center;" rowspan=2| 2013-14
| style="text-align:left;" rowspan=1| Hamamatsu Phoenix
| style="text-align:center;" rowspan=3| bj League
| 27 || 21.0 || .490 || .185 || .577 || 6.0 || 1.3 || 1.1 || .4 || 9.1
|-
| align="left" rowspan=2| Akita Northern Happinets
| 20 || 23.5 || .677 || .0 || .400 || 7.8 || 1.4 || .5 || .5 || 12.5
|-
| align="left" | 2014-15
| 47 || 24.7 || .585 || .333 || .626 || 8.8 || 1.6 || .9 || .6 || 14.3
|-
| style="text-align:center;" rowspan=4| 2015-16
| align="left" rowspan=2| Banvit
| style="text-align:center;" rowspan=1| BSL
| 4 || 6.8 || .222 || .0 || .500 || 1.7 || .2 || .2 || .2 || 1.2
|-
| style="text-align:center;" rowspan=1| EuroCup
| 5 || 8.2 || .643 || .0 || .600 || 3.0 || .2 || .0 || .0 ||  4.2
|-
| align="left" |  Bandirma Kirmizi
| style="text-align:center;" rowspan=1| TBL
| 7 || 	34.3 || .512 || .333 || .480 || 10.1 || 1.4 || 1.4 || 1.2 || 15.2
|-
| align="left" |  Châlons-Reims
| style="text-align:center;" rowspan=1| Pro A
| 19 || 21.6 || .545 || .167 || .558 || 3.8 || .8 || .5 || .1 || 8.9
|-
| style="text-align:center;" rowspan=2| 2016-17
| style="text-align:left;" rowspan=1| Akita Northern Happinets
| style="text-align:center;" rowspan=1| B.League
| 41 || 20.9 || .581 || .300 || .529 || 7.2 || .7 || .7 || .5 || 10.3
|-
| style="text-align:left;" rowspan=1| Los Angeles D-Fenders
| style="text-align:center;" rowspan=1| NBDL
| 10 || 18.9 || .603 || .0 || .588 || 5.5 || .5 || .3 || .7 || 8.0 
|-
| style="text-align:center;" rowspan=2| 2017-18
| style="text-align:left;" rowspan=1| Cagliari
| style="text-align:center;" rowspan=1| Serie A2
| 28 || 32.6 || .599 || .381 || .567 || 8.4 || 1.3 || .5 || .4 || 16.0
|-
| style="text-align:left;" rowspan=1| Trotamundos
| style="text-align:center;" rowspan=1| LPB
| 6 || 25.5 || .589 || .400 || .500 || 6.8 || 1.3 || .8 || .1 || 12.5
|-
| style="text-align:center;" rowspan=2| 2018-19
| style="text-align:left;" rowspan=1| Maccabi Rishon LeZion
| style="text-align:center;" rowspan=2| IPL
| 24 || 25.9 || .566 || .289 || .440 || 5.3 || 1.2 || .9 || .5 || 11.3
|-
| style="text-align:left;" rowspan=1| Hapoel Tel Aviv

| 9 || 20.1 || .544 || .000 || .417 || 4.6 || .2 || 1.0 || .4 || 7.4
|-
| style="text-align:center;" rowspan=2| 2019-20
| style="text-align:left;" rowspan=1| Bologna
| style="text-align:center;" rowspan=1| Serie A
| 5 || 20.6 || .733 || .000 || .286 || 4.0 || .6 || .4 || 1.4 || 9.6
|-
| style="text-align:left;" rowspan=1| Scafati
| style="text-align:center;" rowspan=1| Serie A2
|  ||    ||      ||   ||     ||     ||     ||    ||     || 
|-

Source: RealGM

Playoffs 

|-
|style="text-align:left;"|2013-14
|style="text-align:left;"|Akita
| 6 || 0 || 17.67 || .571 || .000 || .640 || 5.5 || 1.0 || 0.17 || 0.33 ||9.0
|-
|style="text-align:left;"|2016-17
|style="text-align:left;"|SBL
| 3 || 0 || 14.6 || .538 || .000 || 1.000 || 2.33 || 0.00 || 0.00 || 1.33 ||5.33
|-
|style="text-align:left;"|2018-19
|style="text-align:left;"|Hapoel
| 3 ||  || 16.3 || .222 || .000 || .000 || 4.3 || 0.0 || 1.0 || 0.0 ||1.3
|-

Source: ディショーン・スティーブンス

References

External links 

RealGM profile
Bj League Dunk Contest

1989 births
Living people
ABA League players
Akita Northern Happinets players
American expatriate basketball people in Bosnia and Herzegovina
American expatriate basketball people in France
American expatriate basketball people in Israel
American expatriate basketball people in Italy
American expatriate basketball people in Japan
American expatriate basketball people in Turkey
American expatriate basketball people in Venezuela
American men's basketball players
Bandırma B.İ.K. players
Basketball players from Los Angeles
Centers (basketball)
Chatsworth High School alumni
Dinamo Sassari players
Fortitudo Pallacanestro Bologna players
Hapoel Tel Aviv B.C. players
KK Igokea players
Lega Basket Serie A players
Los Angeles D-Fenders players
Maccabi Rishon LeZion basketball players
Power forwards (basketball)
Reims Champagne Basket players
San Diego State Aztecs men's basketball players
San-en NeoPhoenix players
Santa Monica Corsairs men's basketball players
Trotamundos B.B.C. players